Foxhole may refer to:
 Foxhole, a type of defensive fighting position constructed in a military context
 Foxholes, Hertford, an eastern suburb of Hertford
 Foxholes, North Yorkshire, a village and civil parish in Northern England
 Foxhole, Cornwall, a village in mid Cornwall
 Foxhole, Scotland, a hamlet in the Scottish Highlands
 Foxhole (band), a post-rock band from Bowling Green, America
 Foxhole (video game), a sandbox massively multiplayer online game

See also 
 Foxhole in Cairo, a 1960 British war film
 Foxhole (film), a 2021 American war film
 Foxhole radio, a radio built by G.I.s during World War II
 Foxhole Heath, an area of a heathland near the village of Eriswell in Suffolk
 Dugout to Foxhole, a 1994 book written by Rick Van Blair
 The Empty Foxhole, a  1967 album by the American jazz saxophonist Ornette Coleman
 Foxhole conversion, an aphorism used to argue that in times of extreme stress or fear all people will believe in, or hope for, a higher power
 "The Magic Foxhole", a 1944 unpublished short story by J.D. Salinger